Romany Jones is a British sitcom made by London Weekend Television, broadcast between 1972 and 1975, involving the comic misadventures of two layabout families living on a caravan site. The show was designed as a vehicle for James Beck and also featured Arthur Mullard and Queenie Watts as Wally and Lily Briggs.

Following Beck's death in August 1973, Bert and Betty Jones were written out of the series. Jonathan Cecil and Gay Soper took over the lead roles, playing new neighbours, Jeremy and Susan Crichton-Jones.

The show's pilot episode had been made by Thames Television and  broadcast in 1972. It was followed by a spin-off sequel in 1976 entitled Yus, My Dear, starring Mullard and Watts.

Cast
Arthur Mullard - Wally Briggs
Queenie Watts - Lily Briggs
James Beck - Bert Jones (series 1 and 2)
Jo Rowbottom - Betty Jones (series 1 and 2)
Kevin Brennan - Mr Gibson (series 1 and 2)
Maureen Sweeney as Val Finch (series 2-4)
Jonathan Cecil - Jeremy Crichton-Jones (series 3 and 4)
Gay Soper - Susan Crichton-Jones (series 3 and 4)
Alan Ford as Ken (series 3 and 4)

Episodes

Pilot (1972)

Series 1 (1973)

Series 2 (1973)

Series 3 (1974)

Series 4 (1975)

Trivia
Chris Boucher, later to write extensively for science fiction shows including Doctor Who, Blake's 7 and Star Cops, wrote the episode "Run Rabbit Run".
 Arthur English played Wally Briggs in the pilot episode.
 Mullard and Watts reprised their roles as Wally and Lily in Holiday on the Buses.

DVD release

Notes

External links
Romany Jones at BBC Comedy

James Beck Online

1972 British television series debuts
1975 British television series endings
ITV sitcoms
London Weekend Television shows
Television series by ITV Studios
1970s British sitcoms
English-language television shows